The Antarctic Sound  is a sound in King Christian X Land, Northeast Greenland. Administratively it is part of the Northeast Greenland National Park zone.

History
The sound was named by Alfred Gabriel Nathorst after his ship Antarctic, on which he found and first mapped this fjord branch in 1899 during the Swedish Greenland Expedition in search of survivors of S. A. Andrée's Arctic balloon expedition of 1897.

Geography
It is a fjord forming a channel that runs roughly from northwest to southeast between the southern shore of mid Kaiser Franz Joseph Fjord to the north and the head of King Oscar Fjord to the south. Its minimum width is 3 km. 

The Antarctic Sound separates the northeastern shore of Suess Land —part of the Greenland mainland— from the southwestern shore of Ymer Island. Ruth Island lies off the southeastern mouth of the sound.

See also
List of fjords of Greenland

Niviarsiat, NE Greenland

References

External links 

Explanatory notes to the Geological map of Greenland
Antarctic Sund, Eastern Greenland - 28.8.10
Massive iceberg, Antarctic Sund, Eastern Greenland - 28.8.10

Sounds of North America
Straits of Greenland
Fjords of Greenland